The Oxford Dictionary of Philosophy (1994; second edition 2008; third edition 2016) is a dictionary of philosophy by the philosopher Simon Blackburn, published by Oxford University Press.

References 
 Blackburn, Simon ([2005] 2008), 2nd rev. ed. The Oxford Dictionary of Philosophy. Description.  Oxford University Press, Oxford. ISBN 0-19-283134-8. pp. 415. Retrieved 2012-03-29.
 Blackburn, Simon (2016), 3rd ed. The Oxford Dictionary of Philosophy. Description & arrow-scrollable preview. Oxford University Press, 541 pp. Oxford. ISBN 978-0-19-873530-4.  Retrieved 2019-10-10.

External links
The Oxford Dictionary of Philosophy Companion Website

1994 non-fiction books
Books by Simon Blackburn
Dictionaries of philosophy
English dictionaries
English-language books
English non-fiction books
Oxford dictionaries